"I Know" is a song by Norwegian singer Tone Damli from her third studio album I Know (2009). It was released in Norway on 27 April 2009. The song peaked at number 4 on the Norwegian Singles Chart.

Track listing

Chart performance

Release history

References

2009 singles
Tone Damli songs
2009 songs